Tinta District is one of eight districts of the Canchis Province in Peru.

Geography 
The most important river of the district is the Willkanuta which crosses the district from south-east to north-west.

Ethnic groups 
The people in the district are mainly indigenous citizens of Quechua descent. Quechua is the language which the majority of the population (75.37%) learnt to speak in childhood, 24.33% of the residents started speaking using the Spanish language (2007 Peru Census).

See also 
 Kimsachata

References